The Sevron is a  long river in the Ain and Saône-et-Loire departments, eastern France. Its source is in Meillonnas. It flows generally north-northwest. It is a left tributary of the Solnan, into which it flows at Varennes-Saint-Sauveur.

Departments and communes along its course
This list is ordered from source to mouth: 
 Ain: Meillonnas, Treffort-Cuisiat, Saint-Étienne-du-Bois, Bény, Marboz, Pirajoux, Beaupont, Cormoz, 
 Saône-et-Loire: Varennes-Saint-Sauveur,

References

Rivers of France
Rivers of Auvergne-Rhône-Alpes
Rivers of Bourgogne-Franche-Comté
Rivers of Ain
Rivers of Saône-et-Loire